Naked is the debut solo album by English singer Louise. Released in July 1996, it peaked at number seven on the UK Albums Chart and sold over 300,000 copies in the UK alone, being certified platinum.

Background 
After leaving Eternal, Louise signed a solo record deal with First Avenue Management. She was still under contract to EMI Records at that time, and in October 1995 she released her debut solo single, "Light of My Life", which peaked at No. 8.

Six months later, Louise's second single "In Walked Love" (previously a hit for American dance-pop group Exposé), peaked at No. 17.  However, her third single, "Naked", was a bigger hit, peaking at No. 5 in the UK. The album Naked was released shortly afterwards. Two further singles, "Undivided Love" and "One Kiss from Heaven", also became top-10 hits later in 1996.

Track listing 
All tracks written by Simon Climie/Denis Ingoldsby/Oliver Smallman, unless otherwise noted.

 "Naked" (Trevor Steel/John Holliday/Ingoldsby) – 3:32
 "In Walked Love" (Diane Warren) – 3:54
 "Light of My Life" – 4:15
 "The Best That You Bring" (Dave James/Sheppard Solomon) – 3:48
 "One Kiss from Heaven" – 4:04
 "Thinking About You Baby" (Dennis Charles/Ronnie Wilson) – 3:36
 "Discussions" (Charles/Louise Nurding/Wilson) – 4:01
 "Undivided Love" – 3:46
 "Back to Love" (Nurding/Johnny Douglas/Joseph Boussard/Ralph Williams/Carrol Washington) – 4:38
 "Never Too Late" (Climie/Dozier) – 4:04
 "Goodbye to Love" (Charles/Wilson) – 3:22
 "That's the Way I Like It" (Charles/Nurding/Wilson) – 3:38
 "I'll Fly Away" (Douglas/Nurding/Ricky Walters) – 4:30
 "I Gave You My Love" (Charles/Nurding/Wilson) – 3:36

Japanese bonus tracks
 "All of You" – 3:46
 "Real Love" – 4:21

Charts

Weekly charts

Year-end charts

Certifications

References 

1996 debut albums
EMI Records albums
Louise Redknapp albums